Barloworld may refer to:

Barloworld Limited
Barloworld (cycling team)